Matizes (in English Hues) is an album of singer and songwriter Brazilian Djavan, released in 2007.

Track listing
 Joaninha (Djavan) – 5:35
 Azedo e Amargo (Djavan) – 4:41
 Mea-Culpa (Djavan) – 4:04
 Imposto (Djavan) – 4:16
 Delírio dos Mortais (Djavan) – 3:50
 Louça-Fina (Djavan) – 5:12
 Matizes (Djavan) – 4:59
 Por Uma Vida em Paz (Djavan) – 4:44
 Desandou (Djavan) – 4:35
 Adorava Me Ver Como Seu (Djavan) – 4:50
 Pedra (Djavan) – 4:48
 Fera (Djavan) – 7:38

References

Djavan albums
2007 albums